Éric Caritoux (born 16 August 1960 in Carpentras, Vaucluse) is a French former professional road racing cyclist who raced between 1983 and 1994. He had 22 victories in his career, the highlights of which were winning the Vuelta a España in 1984 and taking the French road race championships in 1988 and 1989. He rode the Tour de France on 11 occasions, his best finish being 12th in 1989.

Early years 
Caritoux was born in Carpentras in Provence at the foot of Mont Ventoux. He first started cycle racing as a junior with the local club in Carpentras, he developed into a strong climber riding in the hilly Vaucluse region and often using Mont Ventoux in his training rides. As an amateur Caritoux won the 1982 edition of the Tour du Vaucluse Open beating future Tour de France winner Laurent Fignon into second place, he clinched that victory by winning the 15 kilometre mountain time trial up Mont Ventoux between Bédoin and Chalet Reynard. That win persuaded Jean de Gribaldy manager of the Sem–France Loire professional squad to sign Caritoux for the 1983 season.

The 1983 SEM team had Sean Kelly as team leader and Caritoux soon fitted into the role of Kelly's main helper in stage races. In 1984, Skil became main team sponsors (making the Skil–Sem team) and Éric showed that he had potential to be more than just Kelly's helper in the mountains, he started the season by taking the Tour du Haut Var, a tough hilly one day race in the south of France and then won the Orange to Mont Ventoux stage of Paris–Nice. He was then given a short break in early April by his manager as the team concentrated on the spring classics for Sean Kelly, races which did not suit Caritoux.

1984 Vuelta a España victory 
The story of Caritoux's victory in the 1984 Vuelta a España is quite extraordinary in that he won a Grand Tour as a second year professional which is quite unusual. However, even more unusual is that, one week before the start, neither Caritoux or his team had any intention of actually riding the race. At that time the Vuelta started in the second half of April and the Skil manager Jean de Gribaldy had made a promise at the start of the year to the Vuelta organisers that his team would be on the start line. A promise he had forgotten about but the organisers had not, de Gribaldy was threatened with a £50,000 fine if the team did not ride, he had to scrape together a squad for the Vuelta at the last minute, this included the holidaying Caritoux, who was told to get to Geneva and then fly to Jerez de la Frontera in the south of Spain where the Vuelta was starting.

Caritoux rode himself into form and won the race's first mountain stage which finished on top of the Rassos de Peguera in the Pyrenees, he then rode admirably on stage 12 which finished at the Lagos de Covadonga summit and took over the leaders Gold Jersey from Pedro Delgado. Nobody, including Caritoux himself, thought he could hold the lead until the race finish a week later, his team was weak and he had no support in the mountains. However, Caritoux did hold the lead and went into the final day with a 37 seconds lead, the final stage was a time trial, Caritoux was no time trialler and nearest rival Alberto Fernandez was. Caritoux rode the time trial knowing this might be his only chance to win a major race, his determination came through and won the 1984 Vuelta a España by a mere six seconds.

Latter years 
Impressively, Caritoux showed his performance in the 1984 Vuelta was real by returning the following year and once again competing with the elite General Classification riders. He finished in 6th place overall, but then joined the poorly organised Fagor team for the 1986 season and had two years of modest results. He rejoined Sean Kelly in 1988 at the Kas squad and had more success, taking the French road race championships. In 1989 he joined RMO to work with team leader Charly Mottet and repeated his French championship win. He stayed with RMO until the team folded in 1992 and then switched to the small Chazal team run by manager Vincent Lavenu for the final two years of his career, Éric was team leader at Chazal and mentor for the team's younger professionals of which the team was mostly composed of. During the 1993 Tour de France his  team was chosen by the Tour as a wildcard invitation and he was their highest placed rider in 37th place. Most of their riders finished around 100th place but also on this team was a young Jaan Kirsipuu who later in his career would win several sprint stages in the Tour de France. In 1994 the Tour de France's 15th stage finished in Eric's home town of Carpentras and he was hoping to grab glory in his final year as a pro, however he was foiled by lone breakaway Eros Poli, Caritoux finished in a group with race leader Miguel Induráin at two minutes behind Poli.

Between 1983 and 1994 Caritoux was a remarkably consistent rider in the Tour de France finishing in the top 40 ten times and breaking into the top 20 on five occasions.

Éric Caritoux retired from professional cycling at the end of the 1994 season at the age of 34. He today owns his own vineyard and holiday business in the Carpentras area and has recently worked on the Tour de France as a courtesy driver for the guests of France Telecom.

Career achievements

Major results

1982
 1st Overall Tour du Vaucluse
1st Stage 4
1983
 1st Grand Prix d'Aix-en-Provence
 1st Stage 4 Tour du Vaucluse
1984
 1st  Overall Vuelta a España 
1st Stage 7
 1st Tour du Haut-Var
 1st Bol d'Or des Monédières
 2nd Polynormande
 3rd GP Ouest France–Plouay
 4th Overall Tour Méditerranéen
 6th Overall Tour of the Basque Country
 7th Road race, UCI Road World Championships
 8th Overall Paris–Nice
1st Stage 4a
 8th Paris–Tours
1985
 1st  Overall Flèche du Sud
 2nd Overall Tour Méditérranéen
1st Stage 2
 2nd Overall Grand Prix du Midi-Libre
 6th Overall Vuelta a España
 6th Overall Critérium du Dauphiné Libéré
 6th Subida a Arrate
 7th Overall Setmana Catalana de Ciclisme
 7th Overall Paris–Nice
1986
 1st Trophée des Grimpeurs
 3rd Tour de Vendée
 4th Overall Grand Prix du Midi-Libre
 5th Overall 4 Jours de Dunkerque
 5th Overall Paris–Nice
 5th Overall Étoile de Bessèges
1988
 1st  Road race, National Road Championships
 5th Overall Tour Méditerranéen
 7th Overall Critérium du Dauphiné Libéré
1989
 1st  Road race, National Road Championships
 1st Bol d'Or des Monédières
 2nd Polynormande
 3rd Critérium des As
 3rd Overall Tour du Vaucluse
 7th Overall Critérium du Dauphiné Libéré
 8th Overall Paris–Nice
 8th Overall Étoile de Bessèges
1990
 1st Stage 3b Grand Prix du Midi-Libre
 2nd Grand Prix de la Ville de Rennes
 3rd Overall Tour d'Armorique
1991
 1st Tour du Haut-Var
 1st Prix d'Aix-en-Provence
 3rd Coppa Placci
 8th Overall Paris–Nice
 10th Overall Tour Méditerranéen
1992
 4th Rund um den Henninger Turm
 9th GP Ouest France–Plouay
 10th Overall Tour de Romandie
1993
 1st Stage 2 Tour de l'Ain
 2nd Tour de Berne
 3rd Trophée des Grimpeurs
 6th Overall Critérium du Dauphiné Libéré
1994
 7th Overall Grand Prix du Midi-Libre
 8th Classique des Alpes
 9th Overall Critérium du Dauphiné Libéré

Grand Tour general classification results timeline

References

External links
 
 Complete french site about Jean de Gribaldy

1960 births
Living people
People from Carpentras
French male cyclists
Vuelta a España winners
French Vuelta a España stage winners
Sportspeople from Vaucluse
Cyclists from Provence-Alpes-Côte d'Azur